Klettstedt is a village and a former municipality in the Unstrut-Hainich-Kreis district of Thuringia, Germany. Since 1 January 2019, it is part of the town Bad Langensalza.

References

Bad Langensalza
Former municipalities in Thuringia